Hypostomus taphorni is a species of catfish in the family Loricariidae. It is native to South America, where it occurs in the Essequibo River basin. The species reaches  SL and is believed to be a facultative air-breather.

References 

taphorni
Fish described in 1984